The 2008 Speedway World Cup Event 2 was the second race of the 2008 Speedway World Cup season. It took place on 14 July 2008 in the Brandon stadium in Coventry, Great Britain.

Results

Heat details

Heat after heat 
 (58.6) N.Pedersen, Lindgren, Nicholls, Kus
 (59.1) Iversen, Harris, Ljung, Dryml
 (59.4) Bjerre, Richardson, Jonsson, Rymel
 (58.9) Davidsson, Andersen, Sitera, Stead
 (59.9) B.Pedersen, Allen, Nermark, Tomicek
 (59.6) Bjerre, Nermark, Sitera, Nicholls - joker
 (59.9) Lindgren, Tomicek, Harris, Andersen
 (60.0) B.Pedersen, Ljung, Richardson, Kus
 (59.2) N.Pedersen, Jonsson, Stead, Dryml
 (60.2) Davidsson - joker, Iversen, Rymel, Allen
 (60.7) Rymel, Andersen, Ljung, Nicholls (X)
 (59.8) Jonsson, B.Pedersen, Harris, Sitera
 (59.8) Davidsson, N.Pedersen, Tomicek, Richardson
 (60.6) Nermark, Iversen, Stead, Rymel - joker (X)
 (60.8) Bjerre, Lindgren, Allen, Dryml
 (60.1) Iversen, Nicholls, Jonsson, Tomicek
 (60.3) Harris, Bjerre, Davidsson, Sitera
 (60.5) Andersen, Richardson, Nermark, Dryml
 (60.4) B.Pedersen, Lindgren and Harris (both 1.5 points), Rymel HARRIS and LINDGREN receive 1.5 points each
 (60.1) N.Pedersen, Allen, Ljung, Sitera
 (61.0) Davidsson, B.Pedersen, Nicholls, Tomicek
 (61.0) N.Pedersen, Rymel, Harris (x/dublel), Nermark (Fx)
 (61.0) Lindgren, Iversen, Richardson, Sitera
 (61.2) Bjerre, Ljung, Tomicek, Stead
 (61.1) Andersen, Jonsson, Kus, Allen

References

See also 
 2008 Speedway World Cup
 motorcycle speedway

E2